Barnaby Thomas Gerard Joyce (born 17 April 1967) is an Australian politician who served as the 17th deputy prime minister of Australia under Malcolm Turnbull from 2016 to 2018 and under Scott Morrison from 2021 to 2022. He was the leader of the National Party of Australia.

Joyce was born in Tamworth, New South Wales, and is a graduate of the University of New England. In 1999, he set up an accountancy practice in St George, Queensland. Joyce was elected to the Australian Senate at the 2004 federal election, taking office in 2005. He became the National Party's Senate leader in 2008. At the 2013 election, he transferred to the House of Representatives, winning the rural seat of New England in New South Wales.

During 2013, Joyce replaced Nigel Scullion as deputy leader of the National Party. He succeeded Warren Truss as party leader and deputy prime minister in 2016. In the Abbott and Turnbull governments, Joyce served as Minister for Agriculture (2013–2015), Minister for Agriculture and Water Resources (2015–2017), Minister for Resources and Northern Australia (2017) and Minister for Infrastructure and Transport (2017–2018).

During the 2017–18 Australian parliamentary eligibility crisis, Joyce was confirmed to be a dual citizen of New Zealand, which is forbidden under Section 44 of the Constitution of Australia. On 27 October 2017, the High Court of Australia ruled that he had been ineligible to be a candidate for the House of Representatives at the time of the 2016 election. Joyce re-entered parliament in December 2017 after winning the New England by-election with a large swing against low-profile opposition. In February 2018, he resigned his ministerial and leadership roles after acknowledging that he was in a relationship and expecting a child with a former staffer. He was succeeded by Michael McCormack, but remained in the party as a backbencher. In June 2021, Joyce defeated McCormack in a leadership spill to return as deputy prime minister. Following the Liberal-National coalition's loss at the 2022 federal election, Joyce was replaced by David Littleproud as leader of the National Party, after a leadership challenge and is now the Shadow Minister for Veterans' Affairs.

Early life and career
Joyce was born in Tamworth, New South Wales and raised as one of six children on a sheep and cattle property about 60 kilometres north-east at Danglemah near Woolbrook. Joyce is the son of Marie and James Joyce, who were farmers. His father, a World War II veteran, was born in New Zealand and moved to Australia in 1947. Joyce's paternal grandfather John P. Joyce was a career soldier who participated in the Gallipoli Campaign of World War I, including the landing at Anzac Cove.

Joyce attended Woolbrook Public School, boarded at Saint Ignatius' College, Riverview in Sydney, and graduated from the University of New England (UNE) Armidale with a Bachelor of Financial Administration in 1989. Joyce met Natalie Abberfield at UNE. They married in 1993. After graduating, Joyce moved around northern New South Wales and Queensland as a farm worker, nightclub bouncer, and rural banker. From 1991 to 2005, Joyce worked in the accounting profession, and founded his own accountancy firm Barnaby Joyce & Co. in St George, Queensland in 1999. He is a fellow of CPA Australia. From 1996 to 2001, Joyce served in the Royal Queensland Regiment of the Australian Army Reserve.

Senator for Queensland (2005–2013)

In the 2004 Australian federal election, Joyce was elected to the Senate representing Queensland and the National Party. His term ran from 1 July 2005 until 30 June 2011. He was re-elected at the 2010 election as a member of the Liberal National Party, which was formed by a merger of the Queensland divisions of the two non-Labor parties.

Before taking his seat in July 2005, Joyce said that the government should not take his support for granted. As a senator, he crossed the floor nineteen times during the term of the Howard Government. Joyce initially expressed misgivings about the government's proposed sale of Telstra, the partially state-owned telecommunications company; nevertheless, Joyce voted in favour of the sale a few months later in September 2005. This led the Labor Party to label Joyce "Backdown Barney" and "Barnaby Rubble" in an acrimonious parliamentary debate. As the Telstra Sale Legislation had been pursued by the lower house in prior parliamentary sessions with no assistance package for regional Australia, Joyce was later credited with holding out until the multibillion-dollar assistance package was negotiated and delivered.

Joyce opposed the free provision of the Gardasil vaccine.

In May 2006, after a one-month visit to Antarctica as a member of the External Territories Committee, Joyce promoted mining there, banned under the Antarctic Treaty, and stated that other nations did not recognise Australia's 42 per cent claim over Antarctica. The proposal was roundly condemned by Federal Environment Minister Ian Campbell, Labor Opposition spokesman Anthony Albanese and others.

Crossing the floor
As a Senator, Joyce used the threat of crossing the floor to extract concessions from his own government on various issues, most notably in relation to the sale of Telstra. He crossed the floor 28 times and there was a perception that he was a "maverick" and someone not beholden to the Liberals. The They Vote For You website, which monitors the voting patterns of federal politicians, records that Joyce has "rebelled" against the party whip in 1.1% of divisions.
The following table lists the legislation on which Joyce has crossed the floor, but does not include motions.

Leader of the Nationals in the Senate

In September 2008, after replacing Nigel Scullion as Leader of the Nationals in the Senate, Joyce stated that his party in the upper house would no longer necessarily vote with their Liberal counterparts in the upper house, which opened up another possible avenue for the Labor government to pass legislation. Joyce gained the majority support of the five Nationals (including one Country Liberal Party) senators through Fiona Nash and John Williams. The takeover was not expected nor revealed to the party until after it took place. Joyce remained leader of his party despite the Queensland divisions of the Liberal and National parties merging into the Liberal National Party of Queensland in July 2008.

In 2009 when Opposition Leader Malcolm Turnbull decided that the Coalition would support the Rudd Government's emissions trading scheme (ETS), Joyce as Nationals Senate leader helped trigger the rebellion within Coalition ranks against it.

The issue with the ETS would lead to Turnbull being replaced as Liberal leader by Tony Abbott.

Abbott then appointed Joyce as Shadow Finance Minister.

In February 2010, Joyce as Shadow Finance Minister declared that Australia was "going to hock to our eyeballs to people overseas" and was "getting to a point where we can't repay it". This led to a response from the Governor of the Reserve Bank, Glenn Stevens, that he had "yet to meet a finance minister [sic] who has ever mused any possibility about debt default of his own country" and that there were "few things less likely than Australia defaulting on its sovereign debt".

Senator Joyce's time as Shadow Finance Minister was fraught with difficulties which also infamously saw him confusing trillions with billions in his first appearance as Shadow Finance Minister at the National Press Club and became the source of ridicule by the Government.

There were calls from within the Coalition that Joyce be removed from the Finance portfolio as it was a distraction in their attacks on the Government which was having its own problems with the insulation scheme.

Joyce lasted as Shadow Finance Minister for three months from December 2009 to March 2010 when Abbott, in a reshuffle, moved him to Regional Development, Infrastructure and Water.

In the 2010 election, Joyce was reelected to parliament on the LNP ticket with Senators George Brandis and Brett Mason, and Joyce got more below the line votes than above the line votes. He was reappointed to the Shadow Ministry with his portfolio renamed as Regional Development, Local Government and Water as well as remaining as leader of the Nationals in the Senate.

House of Representatives

In April 2013, Joyce won the Nationals preselection for the House of Representatives seat of New England in New South Wales for the September 2013 election. The seat was held on a margin of 21.52% by independent politician Tony Windsor, who had decided to retire. Independent state parliamentarian Richard Torbay had been preselected as National candidate in August 2012, but was pushed out due to concerns about his ownership of several Centrelink buildings and reports that he received secret donations from Labor interests to run against National candidates.

Joyce had expressed interest in transferring to the lower house for some time. He had initially mulled running in Maranoa, which included his home in St George, but this was brought undone when that seat's longtime member, Bruce Scott, refused to stand aside in his favour. When Torbay's candidacy imploded, the state Nationals felt chagrin at Joyce's renewed interest, even though he had been born in Tamworth and had spent much of his youth on both sides of the Tweed. They initially floated NSW Deputy Premier Andrew Stoner as a replacement for Torbay. Ultimately, however, Joyce faced little opposition in the preselection contest. He resigned from the Senate on 8 August 2013, and Barry O'Sullivan was selected to replace him in the Senate.

Joyce won the seat of New England with a margin of 21 points. He was the first person to win back both a Senate seat and a House of Representatives seat previously lost by the Coalition. The Nationals had held New England without interruption from 1922 until Windsor won the seat in 2001, and had been heavily tipped to regain it with Windsor's retirement. During Windsor's tenure, most calculations of "traditional" two-party matchups between the Nationals and Labor had shown it as a comfortably safe National seat. Joyce is one of only a handful of people to have represented multiple states in parliament, and the only person to have represented one state in the Senate and a different state in the House of Representatives.

By Windsor's account, Joyce revealed that if Windsor had contested the seat, rather than retired, Prime Minister Abbott's office was ready to finance a range of projects in the New England to aid Joyce's campaign (including $50 million for Armidale hospital); however, once there was no competition, all but $5 million was reallocated to other electorates.

Following the 2013 election, Joyce was elected deputy leader of the Nationals. On 18 September 2013, Joyce was sworn in as Minister for Agriculture. On 21 September 2015, this portfolio was expanded to include Water Resources in the First Turnbull Ministry.

In September 2015, Joyce gained international attention after warning actor Johnny Depp that his two pet dogs would be euthanised if not removed from Australia after being imported illegally.

At the 2016 election, Joyce faced a stiff challenge from Tony Windsor, who came out of retirement to contest. Seat-level polling in the seat of New England found Joyce and Windsor neck and neck, however Joyce won with a majority on the primary vote, enough to retain the seat without the need for preferences.

Election as Nationals leader

On 11 February 2016, Leader of the National Party, Warren Truss announced his intended retirement and Barnaby Joyce was elected unopposed as his replacement, with Fiona Nash as his deputy. Joyce was sworn in as Deputy Prime Minister of Australia on 18 February 2016. On 7 December 2017, Bridget McKenzie replaced Nash as deputy leader of the Nationals.

Constitutional eligibility
On 14 August 2017, Joyce became embroiled in the 2017 Australian parliamentary eligibility crisis, announcing to the House of Representatives that he had received advice from the New Zealand High Commission that he could possibly hold New Zealand citizenship by descent from his father. Joyce asked the government to have him referred to the High Court in the Court of Disputed Returns for consideration and clarification of his eligibility alongside that of senators Ludlam, Waters, Canavan and Roberts. Later in the day, the New Zealand Department of Internal Affairs and the Crown Law Office confirmed that Joyce was indeed a New Zealand citizen. He quickly renounced his New Zealand citizenship. On 27 October 2017, the High Court ruled that Joyce had been ineligible to be a candidate for the House of Representatives at the time of the 2016 election, since he had been a dual citizen at that time, and that his election was therefore invalid. The ruling cast doubt on the validity of ministerial decisions made after August 2017.

On 2 December 2017, Joyce won the ensuing New England by-election with a healthy two-party swing of 7.5 percent, in the process winning almost two-thirds of the primary vote. He was sworn back into the House four days later, and on the same day was reappointed as Deputy Prime Minister as well as Minister for Agriculture and Water Resources. Prime Minister Turnbull had taken on that portfolio himself after Joyce was forced out of Parliament for the first time. On 20 December 2017, in a rearrangement of the Second Turnbull Ministry, Joyce was appointed as the Minister for Infrastructure and Transport.

During the by-election for New England, Gina Rinehart awarded Joyce the first "National Agricultural and Related Industries prize", worth $40,000.  This was criticised by Labor, and Joyce's office later said that he would "politely decline" the money.

Affair 

On 7 December 2017, Joyce announced that he had separated from his wife. On 6 February 2018 The Daily Telegraph reported that he was expecting a child with his former communications staffer Vikki Campion. Richard Di Natale of the Greens called on Joyce to resign for "clearly breaching the standards required of ministers". Prime Minister Malcolm Turnbull publicly called for Joyce to "consider his own position." This was as much as Turnbull could do under the Coalition agreement, which stipulates that the leader of the Nationals automatically becomes Deputy Prime Minister during periods of Coalition government. Turnbull could not have sacked Joyce unless he was deposed in a National leadership spill. However, Turnbull forced Joyce to go on a week of personal leave instead of acting as prime minister while Turnbull visited the United States. He also announced that the parliamentary code of conduct would be reworded to forbid sexual relationships between ministers and their staff. On 21 February, Turnbull ordered an investigation into whether Joyce had breached the ministerial code of conduct. As of May 2018, the investigation into Joyce's travel expenses was ongoing. In February 2018, Turnbull's office relied on a technicality in stating that Joyce had not breached the ministerial code of conduct when his lover was employed by fellow MPs, arguing Vikki Campion could not be considered the Deputy Prime Minister's "partner" at the time.

Alleged sexual harassment and resignation 

The Nationals received a formal complaint alleging that Joyce had sexually harassed a Western Australian woman. Joyce's spokesman called the complaint "spurious and defamatory." On 23 February, Joyce announced that he would formally resign on 26 February as leader of the National Party, step down from his ministerial portfolios and move to the backbench. On resignation, Joyce lost his Deputy Prime Minister’s and ministerial salaries of $416,000 a year, only to receive a backbencher’s salary of about $200,000. Regional Development Minister John McVeigh became Acting Minister for Infrastructure and Transport. A leadership ballot within the National Party resulted in Michael McCormack becoming party leader and deputy prime minister. In September 2018, it was announced that the National Party's eight-month investigation into the allegations of sexual harassment had been unable to make a determination, and that the report would remain confidential.

Second period as Nationals leader 
On 4 February 2020, Joyce unsuccessfully challenged McCormack as leader of the Nationals. Joyce returned as leader of the Nationals on 21 June 2021, following a leadership spill.

On 29 June 2021, during the second COVID-19 lockdown in Sydney and while being the active Deputy Prime Minister, Barnaby Joyce was fined $200 for not wearing mask in breach of COVID-19 health orders.

In February 2022 it was revealed that Joyce sent a text in March 2021 labelling Prime Minister Scott Morrison a “hypocrite and a liar.” Joyce offered his resignation to the Prime Minister after this became public but the offer was rejected. 

After the coalition's 2022 federal election defeat, Joyce was challenged by his deputy David Littleproud and party member Darren Chester during a routine leadership spill on 30 May 2022. Joyce lost to Littleproud, ending his 11 month term as the leader.

Political positions

Social issues

Abortion
Joyce is opposed to abortion, and in 2018 he lobbied NSW Nationals to vote against a bill to provide "safe zones" around the state's abortion clinics. Since 1 July 2018 within NSW, it is illegal to protest within 150 metres of an abortion service.

Medicinal cannabis
In June 2014, Joyce changed his views about medicinal cannabis and publicly supported calls for the introduction of a medicinal cannabis trial following a high-profile campaign led by a young man in his constituency who was at the time suffering from an aggressive form of terminal cancer. By 2018, medical cannabis was generally legalised across Australia.

Same-sex marriage
In August 2014, Joyce spoke out in opposition to same-sex marriage, attending several rallies on the matter in Canberra. In 2011, he lobbied against a bill proposed by senator Sarah Hanson-Young that would allow for same-sex couples to marry. On 9 December 2017, same-sex marriage was legalised in Australia.

Death penalty
In April 2015, Joyce called for a national debate on capital punishment in Australia, although he is personally opposed to the death penalty.

Refugee intake
In September 2015, Joyce was the first senior minister to call for the Australian Government to accept more Syrian refugees in response to the humanitarian crisis engulfing Turkey and Europe. However, his call to prioritise Christian refugees above those from other faiths drew criticism from some human rights observers.

Parliamentary rules
After the birth of his son Sebastian in April 2018, Joyce advocated for changes to parliamentary rules to allow senators and MPs to hire their spouses or partners and relatives.  When questioned, he denied this could be a conflict of interest. In December 2018, Joyce raised this issue again to no avail.

Religious schools 
In December 2018, Joyce said schools should be allowed to deny enrolment to transgender students.

Burka Ban 
Joyce is opposed to Banning the Burka.

Economic issues

Populist agenda
Joyce has often angered economic rationalist parliamentary colleagues in the LNP Coalition by taking up a number of causes often labelled as populist; such as his support for the retention of a single-desk wheat export marketing system for Australian grain growers, drought assistance for primary producers, amendments to the Trade Practices Act 1974, and media reform regulations that aimed to strengthen the ability of small business to compete with multi-national corporations. When questioned on his views, Joyce stated "Maybe I'm an agrarian socialist."

Foreign investment in Australia
On 17 March 2009, Joyce launched a privately funded advertising campaign to keep Rio Tinto local, attacking a bid by the Chinese government-owned resources company Chinalco, a bid which had also been heavily criticised by Legal & General in the United Kingdom.

Joyce has also opposed the sale of large Australian agricultural assets to foreign investors. In 2012, as the Opposition spokesman for Water, Joyce was vocal in his unsuccessful opposition to the sale of Cubbie Station to a consortium led by a Chinese State Owned Enterprise. In 2013, as Agriculture Minister, Joyce and his National Party colleagues strongly opposed the proposed sale of Australia's largest bulk grain handler GrainCorp to the American company Archer Daniels Midland. The then Liberal Treasurer, Joe Hockey, rejected the sale based on the hugely discretionary "National Interest" grounds which a Treasurer can use to block such transactions. Despite the reasons Hockey used to justify his decision, it was widely reported that the National Party demanded this outcome, with the Labor Shadow Treasurer Chris Bowen accusing the junior Coalition partner of "bullying" the Treasurer into arriving at this decision.

In 2015, Joyce voiced opposition to the sale of another large Australian asset to foreign buyers, this time S. Kidman & Co, which owned the largest combined landholdings in Australia, including the iconic Kidman Station. Most of the known interest came from Chinese companies, and Joyce was accused of xenophobia; claims which he rejected. In November 2015, the Treasurer, Scott Morrison decided that the sale of S. Kidman & Co to any foreign investor would not be approved based on national security grounds, due to part of the company being in the vicinity of the Woomera Prohibited Area, among other reasons. The Labor Shadow Agriculture spokesman Joel Fitzgibbon slammed the Government's decision as "political" and accused it of running a "discriminatory foreign investment regime".

Banking royal commission
When Joyce was leader of the Nationals and deputy prime minister, he repeatedly argued against a banking royal commission. After disturbing evidence emerged after hearings for the Royal Commission into Misconduct in the Banking, Superannuation and Financial Services Industry began in 2018, CPA Joyce said, as a backbencher, that he was wrong and naive in previously opposing a royal commission.

Environmental issues

Renewable energy
Joyce believes that renewable energy causes problems with energy supply. In January 2021 he called upon Zali Steggall, a prominent renewable energy advocate, to explain why renewable energy had led to power cuts in Manly and other Sydney suburbs, and followed up with "I don’t have to win this argument the facts are doing it for me". However enquiries to Ausgrid showed that the outages were not due to renewable energy but to "unforeseen cable faults", and that there was no pressure on the grid when the outages occurred.

Biofouling
In 2015, Joyce received a Froggatt Award from the Invasive Species Council for taking "principled decisions" in regard to the decision to introduce mandatory biofouling rules to prevent marine pests entering Australia, and for acting quickly and decisively in expelling two dogs belonging to Johnny Depp and Amber Heard which had been brought into Australia in an apparent breach of Australia’s strict quarantine laws.

In 2021, Heard announced she had named her new dog after Joyce, in reference to the previous controversy.

Great Barrier Reef
While his biofouling stance is relevant, Joyce has not taken a keen interest in supporting protection of the Great Barrier Reef with a notable lack of engagement in Parliamentary decisions related to the Great Barrier Reef.

Global warming
Joyce is known as one of the climate "doubters" in the Morrison government. During 2015 and 2016, Joyce strongly opposed major coal mining in the Liverpool Plains. In 2018, he joined the Monash Forum, a group of Liberal and National MPs who advocate for building new coal-fired power in Australia. Joyce has been seen as a global warming climate change sceptic, but in 2016 made comment about its possibility based on some of his own personal observations.
In December 2019, he was reported as accepting that the climate was changing but insisting the solution was to respect God, rather than impose a tax to limit emissions. In July 2021, he was reported as saying that the push towards a 2050 net zero carbon emissions commitment is like being served "sautéed gherkins and sashimi tadpoles" at a restaurant, adding that he was "quite happy to consider the menu when you tell me what's on it and what it costs".

Murray-Darling basin
In 2016, Joyce supported reducing environmental water allocations in the Murray–Darling basin in order to reduce the impact on towns and people currently dependent on the rivers. This was contrary to a 2016 election promise by the government, and was widely criticised by environmental groups. In 2017, Joyce stated that the Commonwealth would not intervene regarding accusations of water theft in the basin.

Endangered species
In March 2017, Joyce called for Leadbeater's possum to be taken off the critically endangered species list in order to boost the logging of forest to maintain employment. Environmentalists believe that such action would be devastating for the possum and countered that Joyce was prepared to kill two dogs but not ensure the preservation of an entire species.

Personal life
Joyce is a Roman Catholic.

Joyce met Natalie Abberfield at university. They were married in 1993, and together had four daughters: Julia, Caroline, Odette, and Bridgette. In December 2017, following his extramarital affair with political staffer Vikki Campion, Joyce announced that he and his wife had separated.

In February 2018, news reports confirmed that Joyce and his former staffer Vikki Campion were expecting a son together in April. However, in March 2018, Joyce explained that he and Campion were often physically apart around the time that conception would have most probably occurred, therefore conceding that paternity is "a grey area." Joyce later stated that his doubts had been resolved. On 16 April 2018, Campion gave birth to Sebastian at Armidale Hospital in Armidale, New South Wales. The trio were living in the Armidale area. Joyce and Campion reportedly accepted $150,000 for an interview with Channel 7's Sunday Night program with the money going into a trust fund for Sebastian. On 1 June 2019, a second son (Thomas) was born in Armidale. Joyce became engaged to Campion in January 2022.

References

External links

 ; webpage includes transcript of maiden speech; and all other parliamentary speeches.

|-

|-

|-

|-

|-

|-

|-

|-

|-

Living people
1967 births
Abbott Government
Australian accountants
Australian monarchists
Australian Roman Catholics
Australian people of New Zealand descent
People who lost New Zealand citizenship
Deputy Prime Ministers of Australia
Government ministers of Australia
Leaders of the National Party of Australia
Liberal National Party of Queensland members of the Parliament of Australia
Members of the Australian House of Representatives
Members of the Australian House of Representatives for New England
Members of the Australian Senate
Members of the Australian Senate for Queensland
Australian anti-abortion activists
Members of the Cabinet of Australia
National Party of Australia members of the Parliament of Australia
People educated at Saint Ignatius' College, Riverview
People from Tamworth, New South Wales
Turnbull Government
University of New England (Australia) alumni
21st-century Australian politicians
New Zealand monarchists
New Zealand accountants
21st-century New Zealand politicians
New Zealand Roman Catholics
New Zealand anti-abortion activists
Morrison Government